In computational complexity theory, the complexity class ELEMENTARY of elementary recursive functions is the union of the classes

 
The name was coined by László Kalmár, in the context of recursive functions and undecidability; most problems in it are far from elementary. Some natural recursive problems lie outside ELEMENTARY, and are thus NONELEMENTARY. Most notably, there are primitive recursive problems that are not in ELEMENTARY. We know

LOWER-ELEMENTARY ⊊ EXPTIME ⊊ ELEMENTARY ⊊ PR ⊊ R

Whereas ELEMENTARY contains bounded applications of exponentiation (for example), PR allows more general hyper operators (for example, tetration) which are not contained in ELEMENTARY.

Definition

The definitions of elementary recursive functions are the same as for primitive recursive functions, except that primitive recursion is replaced by bounded summation and bounded product. All functions work over the natural numbers. The basic functions, all of them elementary recursive, are:

 Zero function.  Returns zero: f(x) = 0.
 Successor function: f(x) = x + 1. Often this is denoted by S, as in S(x). Via repeated application of a successor function, one can achieve addition.
 Projection functions: these are used for ignoring arguments. For example, f(a, b) = a is a projection function.
 Subtraction function: f(x, y) = x − y if y < x, or 0 if y ≥ x. This function is used to define conditionals and iteration.

From these basic functions, we can build other elementary recursive functions.

 Composition: applying values from some elementary recursive function as an argument to another elementary recursive function. In f(x1, ..., xn) = h(g1(x1, ..., xn), ..., gm(x1, ..., xn)) is elementary recursive if h is elementary recursive and each gi is elementary recursive.
 Bounded summation:  is elementary recursive if g is elementary recursive.
 Bounded product:  is elementary recursive if g is elementary recursive.

Basis for ELEMENTARY 

Lower elementary recursive functions 

Lower elementary recursive functions follow the definitions as above, except that bounded product is disallowed. That is, a lower elementary recursive function must be a zero, successor, or projection function, a composition of other lower elementary recursive functions, or the bounded sum of another lower elementary recursive function.

Lower elementary recursive functions are also known as Skolem elementary functions.

Whereas elementary recursive functions have potentially more than exponential growth, the lower elementary recursive functions have polynomial growth.

The class of lower elementary functions has a description in terms of composition of simple functions analogous to that we have for elementary functions. Namely, a polynomial-bounded function is lower elementary if and only if it can be expressed using a composition of the following functions: projections, one exponential function ( or ) with the following restriction on the structure of formulas: the formula can have no more than two floors with respect to an exponent (for example,  has 1 floor,  has 2 floors,  has 3 floors).

Descriptive characterization 

In descriptive complexity, ELEMENTARY is equal to the class HO of languages that can be described by a formula of higher-order logic. This means that every language in the ELEMENTARY complexity class corresponds to as a higher-order formula that is true for, and only for, the elements on the language.

See also 
 Elementary function arithmetic
 Primitive recursive function
 Grzegorczyk hierarchy
 EXPTIME

Notes

References 
 Rose, H.E., Subrecursion: Functions and hierarchies, Oxford University Press, 1984. 

Complexity classes
Computability theory